Crossway is a not-for-profit evangelical Christian publishing ministry.

Crossway may also refer to:

Places
Crossway, Herefordshire, England
Crossway, Monmouthshire, Wales
Crossway, Powys, a village in the community of Disserth and Trecoed, Wales
Crossway Green, a village in Worcestershire, England

Organizations and enterprises
Crossway Baptist Church in Melbourne
Crossway College in Queensland

Companies and brands
Irisbus Crossway

See also
Crossways (disambiguation)